Frank Myers may refer to:
 Frank Myers (politician) (1908–1975), politician in Prince Edward Island, Canada
 Frank Myers (basketball), basketball coach
 Frank Myers (American football) (born 1956), American football player, see Indianapolis Colts draft history
 Frank J. Myers, American country music singer
 Frank Harmon Myers, American painter

See also
Francis Myers (disambiguation)